Gizmo! is a 1977 documentary film produced and directed by Howard Smith about improbable inventions, and uses old newsreel footage about these inventions. Early examples of parkour and buildering are also featured, including footage of an urban acrobat, John Ciampa (the "Brooklyn Tarzan"), Frank "Cannonball" Richards and a stuntman, Arnim Dahl.

External links

"Gizmo!" description and review
Film clip from "Gizmo!"
"Gizmo!" on archive.org

1977 films
Documentary films about technology
Films directed by Howard Smith
1977 documentary films
American documentary films
1970s English-language films
1970s American films